NGC 1746 is an asterism in the constellation Taurus that was described in 1863 by Heinrich Louis d'Arrest and as a result was recorded in the New General Catalogue (NGC).  Previously, the object was classified as an open cluster; however, it was shown through more recent observations that it is a random formation of stars in Earth's sky, an asterism.  NGC 1746 has an apparent magnitude of 6.1 and an apparent size of about 40'.

Sources 
 Galadí-Enríquez, D.; Jordi, C.; Trullols, E.: "Astrometry and Photometry of Open Clusters: NGC 1746, NGC 1750 and NGC 1758"; in: Astrophysics and Space Science, Bd. 263, Nr. 1/4, S. 307ff. (1998)

External links 
 

1746
Taurus (constellation)